The Cherry Canyon Formation is a geologic formation found in the Delaware Basin of southeastern New Mexico and western Texas. It contains fossils characteristic of the Guadalupian Age of the Permian Period.

Description
The formation consists mostly of cyclic marine sandstone and siltstone, but with interfingering tongues of gray limestone (the Getaway, South Wells, and Manzanita Members). These extend from the Goat Seep reef, an earlier and much smaller precursor to the Capitan reef, into what was then deep, anoxic water of the Permian Basin. A lower tongue of the formation extends across the basin margin to grade into the nearby San Andres Formation. The formation rests on the Brushy Canyon Formation, but the lower tongue fills a few deep paleochannels that cut down through the Brushy Canyon and the underlying Cutoff Formation into the Victorio Peak Formation. A hiatus in deposition, marking a substantial drop in sea level, separates the Cherry Canyon Formation from the overlying Bell Canyon Formation.

The Getaway Member contains carbonate debris flow beds. All three carbonate members grade into sandstone channel deposits deeper in the basin.

Fossils
The formation contain abundant fish fossils, such as sharks' teeth, preserved within small phosphatic nodules. Ostracods have been identified in the Getaway Member, including Amphissites, Aurikirkbya, Ceratobairdia, Polytylites, and Roundyella.

Economic resources
The Cherry Canyon Formation has been exploited for its hydrocarbon resources. Some of the hydrocarbons present in the formation may have leaked into nearby gypsum beds of the Castile Formation, producing sulfuric acid that contributed to the formation of Carlsbad Cavern.

History of investigation
The unit was first designated as a formation by DeFord and Lloyd in 1940, who raised the Delaware Mountain Formation to group rank and designed its previously informal members as formations.

Footnotes

Bibliography 
 
 Hunt, ReBecca K., Vincent L. Santucci and Jason Kenworthy. 2006. "A preliminary inventory of fossil fish from National Park Service units." in S.G. Lucas, J.A. Spielmann, P.M. Hester, J.P. Kenworthy, and V.L. Santucci (ed.s), Fossils from Federal Lands. New Mexico Museum of Natural History and Science Bulletin 34, pp. 63–69
 
 

Geologic formations of Texas
Permian System of North America
Permian formations of New Mexico
Permian geology of Texas
Roadian
Wordian
Limestone formations
Paleontology in Texas